Grzybowo may refer to the following places:
Grzybowo, Ciechanów County in Masovian Voivodeship (east-central Poland)
Grzybowo, Mława County in Masovian Voivodeship (east-central Poland)
Grzybowo, Płońsk County in Masovian Voivodeship (east-central Poland)
Grzybowo, Wągrowiec County in Greater Poland Voivodeship (west-central Poland)
Grzybowo, Września County in Greater Poland Voivodeship (west-central Poland)
Grzybowo, Pomeranian Voivodeship (north Poland)
Grzybowo, Gmina Człuchów in Pomeranian Voivodeship (north Poland)
Grzybowo, Giżycko County in Warmian-Masurian Voivodeship (north Poland)
Grzybowo, Kętrzyn County in Warmian-Masurian Voivodeship (north Poland)
Grzybowo, West Pomeranian Voivodeship (north-west Poland)